No. 291 Squadron RAF was a Royal Air Force squadron formed as an anti-aircraft cooperation unit in World War II.

History
The squadron formed at RAF Hutton Cranswick in Yorkshire on 20 November 1941. It was equipped initially with Miles Martinets and then Hawker Hurricanes and Lockheed Hudsons. Targets were towed by aircraft to provide practice for the anti-aircraft defences in Eastern England. The squadron was also equipped with the Vultee Vengeance before it was disbanded on 26 June 1945.

Aircraft operated

Source: Jefford

References

External links
 Squadron history (and more) on RafWeb
 Squadron history on the official RAF website

291
No. 291 Squadron
Military units and formations established in 1941